Gobindachandra Das (1855–1918), was a Bengali poet and writer.

Life 

Das was born in Gazipur of Bengal province. He was a very poor man and could not continue study. He was an employee of the Bhawal Estate. He had two daughters and a son. The younger one was named Bhaktimoyi who later was married to Haripada Bhowmik and was the mother of three children. Her son was Dilip Bhowmik(1948-1998). In the last part of his life, Das was in very poor health.

Works 

Gobindachandra Das was a ‘Swavabkobi’, ‘A poet by nature’.

His literary works were included in the curriculum of school level, secondary and higher secondary Bengali literature in Bangladesh.

Some works
 Kunkum
 Kastury
 Prem O Ful
 Boijointi
 Moger Muluk

References 
 Bangla Sahitya (Bengali Literature), the national textbook of intermediate (college) level of Bangladesh published in 1996 by all educational boards.

External links
 
Gobindachandra Das at the West Bengal Public Library Network

1855 births
1918 deaths
20th-century Bengalis
Bengali Hindus
Bengali male poets
Bengali-language poets
Bengali-language writers
Gazipur District